State Route 186 (SR 186) is a state highway in the north-central part of the U.S. state of Georgia. It runs west-east within portions of Walton and Oconee Counties.

Route description
The route begins at an intersection with SR 83 in Good Hope, in Walton County. It heads northeast until it crosses the Apalachee River (where it transitions into Oconee County) and enters North High Shoals, where the route becomes more easterly. Just north of the city limits of Bishop, it meets its eastern terminus, an intersection with US 129/US 441/SR 24.

Major intersections

See also

References

External links

 Georgia Roads (Routes 181 - 200)

186
Transportation in Walton County, Georgia
Transportation in Oconee County, Georgia